David Fisher (born 9 December 2001) is an English professional footballer who plays as a forward for AFC Wimbledon.

Career
Fisher joined Carshalton Athletic on loan and scored a hat trick in the FA Cup within a haul of 6 goals in as many games, before non-league football was interrupted by the COVID-19 pandemic in 2020. He then went to Hampton & Richmond Borough in November 2020, but Wimbledon kept his player registration.

Fisher made his professional debut for Wimbledon in the EFL Cup at home at Plough Lane against Gillingham on 9 August 2022.

Career statistics

References

2001 births
Living people
AFC Wimbledon players
English footballers
Association football forwards